"Worried About Ray" is the debut single of British pop rock band the Hoosiers. The song utilises parts of the Turtles' 1967 hit "Happy Together", so its writers, Alan Gordon and Garry Bonner, are credited as co-writers. It was the first single to be released from the band's debut album, The Trick to Life. It peaked at  5 on the UK Singles Chart and also charted in Belgium, Germany, Ireland, and Switzerland.

Commercial performance
On downloads alone, "Worried About Ray" debuted at No. 16 on the UK Singles Chart on 24 June 2007. It climbed to No. 6 the following week with CD sales included, then rose one place to its peak position of No. 5 the following week.

Music video
In the music video, inspired by the American special effects pioneer Ray Harryhausen, the band are with "Ray", a monster movie director and creator. When creating another monster, that monster talks with him and tries to go after the Hoosiers, but they defeat the monster.

Track listing

Credits and personnel
Credits are adapted from the European CD single liner notes.

Studio
 Recorded at Angelic Studios (Buckinghamshire, UK)

The Hoosiers
 Irwin Sparkes – vocals, guitar, writer
 Alan Sharland – drums, writer
 Martin Skarendahl – bass, writer

Other personnel
 Toby Smith – keys, producer, engineering, recording
 Duri Darms – keys
 Andy Saunders – engineering, recording
 Sam Miller – mixing

Charts

Weekly charts

Year-end charts

Certifications

References

External links
 Music video

2007 debut singles
2007 songs
Cultural depictions of film directors
The Hoosiers songs
RCA Records singles